Ed Halter is a film programmer, writer, and founder of Light Industry, a microcinema in Brooklyn, New York. He currently teaches at Bard College, where he is Critic in Residence.

Criticism 

His writing has been featured in Artforum, The Believer, Bookforum, Cinema Scope, frieze, Little Joe, Mousse, Rhizome, Triple Canopy, and Village Voice. Halter is interested in the intersection of video games, digital media, and American experimental film.

Books 

His first book From Sun Tzu to Xbox was released in 2006. He has edited the compilation Mass Effect: Art and the Internet in the Twenty First Century (2015), with Lauren Cornell. His edited volume From The Third Eye: The Evergreen Review Film Reader was published by Seven Stories Press in 2018; it is a compilation of essays from Evergreen Review which were published from 1950-1970.

Film programming 

Halter has programmed and worked on various film festivals, particularly the New York Underground Film Festival, which ran from 1994 to 2008. He currently helps run and program events at Light Industry.  Light Industry is an exhibition space for experimental film currently housed in Greenpoint, Brooklyn, after moving several locations in and around Brooklyn. Light Industry has the goal of creating a space for the curation and cultivation of a thriving, but fragmented art scene.

Awards 
In 2017, Halter was awarded the Carl & Marlynn Thoma Art Foundation's Arts Writing Awards in Digital Art as an emerging writer.

References

Living people
Bard College faculty
American film critics
Year of birth missing (living people)